Muhammed Emin Sarıkaya (born 3 January 2002) is a Turkish professional footballer who plays as a midfielder for Ankara Keçiörengücü on loan from İstanbul Başakşehir.

Professional career
Muhammed signed his first professional contract with his youth club Bursaspor on 16 May 2018 at the age of 16. Muhammed Emin made his professional debut for Bursaspor in a 1-0 Süper Lig loss to Gençlerbirliği S.K. on 18 May 2018. He made his debut at the age of 16 years, 4 months and 15 days, making him the 4th youngest debutant in the history of the Süper Lig and the first born in 2002.

On 2 September 2019, he has signed 3-year contract with İstanbul Başakşehir.

References

External links
 
 
 
 

2002 births
Living people
People from Oltu
Turkish footballers
Turkey youth international footballers
Association football midfielders
Bursaspor footballers
İstanbul Başakşehir F.K. players
Yeni Malatyaspor footballers
Ankara Keçiörengücü S.K. footballers
Süper Lig players